Christopher Musgrave  may refer to:

Christopher Musgrave (born c.1553), MP for Carlisle (UK Parliament constituency)
Sir Christopher Musgrave, 4th Baronet (1631–1704), Tory politician and MP, teller of the Exchequer
Christopher Musgrave (administrator) (1664–1718), British Ordnance officer and son of the 4th Baronet, MP for Carlisle (UK Parliament constituency)
Sir Christopher Musgrave, 5th Baronet (1688–1736), MP and grandson of the 4th Baronet, MP for Cumberland and Carlisle

See also 
 Musgrave (surname)
 Musgrave baronets